"Digital Estate Planning" is the twentieth episode of the third season of the U.S. television series Community. It originally aired on May 17, 2012, on NBC. The episode featured retro video game–styled graphics and a synthesizer-driven soundtrack reminiscent of 8-bit consoles such as the Nintendo Entertainment System and Master System, with references to multiple classic games on those and later consoles.

The episode was written by Matt Warburton and directed by Adam Davidson.

Plot
Pierce Hawthorne (Chevy Chase) invites the study group, as well as LeVar Burton, who does not show up, to a warehouse. Upon arrival, the study group is greeted by Gilbert Lawson (Giancarlo Esposito), Pierce's deceased father Cornelius Hawthorne's (voiced by Larry Cedar) assistant of thirty years and estate executor. He informs them of Cornelius's last will and testament, whose dying wish was for Pierce and seven friends to play a video game that was developed over the course of thirty years, in response to a request made by Pierce in 1979 to invest in video games.

The group enters a stylized 8-bit video game world full of Cornelius's numerous prejudiced beliefs. They are informed by the in-game voice recording of Cornelius that, as punishment for questioning the economic viability of moist towelettes, the first player to reach the "Throne of Hawkthorne" at the end of the game will win Pierce's inheritance. The group rejects this and vow to give Pierce his inheritance, but Gilbert, taking on the role of the eighth player, reveals that he intends to do so. With complete knowledge of the game he easily kills the group's characters, sending them back to respawn at the start.

After restarting, the group arrives at a town where Abed falls in love with an NPC named Hilda. While exploring the town, Britta mixes random ingredients in a cauldron into what she assumes is a strength potion. Meanwhile, Annie and Shirley accidentally kill the town's blacksmith and his wife (Hilda's parents), then steal everything in the shop and burn it down to cover their tracks. Gilbert appears, having leveled up, and begins easily attacking the group again. However, after Britta dies, Jeff tricks Gilbert into drinking the potion she made and dies when it turns out to be poison. Starting back from the beginning again, Gilbert ruthlessly decides to use cheat codes, turning his character invincible.

The group continues playing, while Abed stays back in town to help Hilda rebuild her life. After beating most of the game, the group finds the "white crystal" needed to enter the castle on the last level. They are again confronted by Gilbert, who kills them and takes the crystal for himself. Jeff and Pierce realize he is cheating and physically confront him outside of the game, where Gilbert reveals that he is Cornelius's son and Pierce's half-brother, the product of Cornelius assaulting Pierce's childhood nanny's "hot cousin"; he claims that he has a greater right to the fortune than Pierce, having been more of a son to Cornelius. The group restart and return to the town where they left Abed to discover that he has built an enormous castle with Hilda and has an endless amount of resources to build whatever they desire.

Gilbert arrives at the final stage of the game, where he is greeted by a recording from Cornelius. He "congratulates" Gilbert on his victory but says that in order to claim the inheritance, Gilbert must agree to sign a document disavowing any family ties to Cornelius and keeping his infidelity secret. Gilbert refuses, prompting Cornelius to start an all-out war of destruction against him.

The study group arrives heavily armed with new equipment and defeats Cornelius, at the cost of their lives. Gilbert is left to claim the inheritance but rejects it, believing he does not deserve the prize. The study group decides to forfeit, Pierce having decided that Gilbert, having put up with Cornelius' humiliating racism and selfishness, endured worse abuse, and that makes him more worthy of taking the inheritance. Gilbert thanks them and beats the game, winning the inheritance. He offers to treat the study group to margaritas as thanks, and bonds with Pierce as half brothers. As the group leaves, Abed sneaks back to copy Hilda from the game onto a flash drive before leaving.

Production
According to Dan Harmon, "Digital Estate Planning" was the last Season 3 episode to be filmed, and led to a heated argument between him and Chevy Chase. The episode's "tag" (run during the credits) was written to feature Abed showing Pierce the flash drive copy of the game, modified to have the virtual version of Pierce playing ball with a giant head of Cornelius, with Cornelius congratulating him every time. Pierce would have then turned to hug Abed as a way of saying thanks. Harmon considered it "one of the most important moments of the season". Chase refused to shoot the scene and left for the day, allegedly because he was tired. Harmon noted that this was a common experience with Chase and they simply would have shot Chase's scenes in the following days. In this case, as it was the final day of shooting, the sets were subsequently torn down and they could not re-shoot it, leading to Harmon's disappointment in losing the scene. This subsequently led to a confrontation between the two during the season's wrap party.

The video game sequences were animated by Titmouse, which had previously animated segments for the show.

After the episode aired, a Reddit user named Derferman made an open-source version of the game seen in the episode for Windows, OS X, and Linux, complete with multiple playable characters, several stages, and music and sound effects.

Reception
In its original broadcast on May 17, 2012, the episode was watched by an estimated 2.97 million people, with a 1.3/5 share in the 18–49 demographic.

IGN gave the episode a rating of 8 out of 10, calling it "a visual good time".

References

External links
 "Digital Estate Planning" at NBC.com
 
 "Journey to the Center of Hawkthorne", the open-source recreation of the game

2012 American television episodes
Community (season 3) episodes
Television episodes about video games
Television episodes with live action and animation